Yan Dasht-e Bala (also Romanized as Yān Dasht-e Bālā; also known as Yān Dasht) is a village in Seh Hezar Rural District, Khorramabad District, Tonekabon County, Mazandaran Province, Iran. At the 2006 census, its population was 139, in 36 families.

References 

Populated places in Tonekabon County